Maria Claudia Nechita (born 15 August 1993) is a Romanian boxer. She competed in the women's featherweight event at the 2020 Summer Olympics.

References

External links

1993 births
Living people
Romanian women boxers
Olympic boxers of Romania
Boxers at the 2020 Summer Olympics